Nova Leigh Paholek (born 22 July 1988), known professionally as Nova Rockafeller, is a Canadian independent rapper, singer, songwriter, and music video director.

Early life 
Rockafeller was born in Edmonton, but raised in Jamaica; spending a quarter of the year there from age 3 to 9 years old and living there full-time from age 9 to 14 after her family started a water sports business. She also briefly lived in Toronto and New York City. As a teen, she dropped out of high school and began rapping during a difficult period of her life split between sleeping at the Edmonton Youth Emergency Shelter and living in a series of group homes. She was inspired to start rapping and exploring the online battle rap forums by her then boyfriend.

Music career
Rockafeller grew up surrounded by music as her father and her brother, Terry Paholek, were heavily involved with the Edmonton music scene and had their own home studio. She began rapping at the age of 15 when she was living in a group home. The moniker 'Nova Rockafeller' was given to her one night during a party with other rappers, who decided she needed a new name.

In 2011, Rockafeller released her debut album Insufficient Funds, which chronicled six months of her life. In 2012, Rockafeller had her song 'call me (BAT MAN) 347-574-7192' posted on the front of The Pirate Bay during its period as 'The Promo Bay'; the song was available as a free download.

Mercury Records took notice of her, so Rockafeller moved to New York and signed with them. The label would later become Island Records, and, in turn Def Jam. Her relationship with Def Jam ended when the company dropped her without warning after three and a half years. She found out when her landlord said that the company would no longer pay her rent. Prior to the label dropping her, Rockafeller had been working on an album named Accidentally Gangster, which was cancelled.

In 2015, during her time with Def Jam, Rockafeller began to break out into the mainstream with her single "Made in Gold", which reached the Top 20 on Sirius Top Hits. The single was featured in teen comedy film The Duff. Her music has also been featured on Siesta Keys, Dancing with the Stars, and Bad Girls Club. That year, she toured with Set it Off and All Time Low, as well as performed at SXSW, Riot Fest, and the Gathering of the Juggalos. Since her appearance at the Gathering, Rockafeller has been associated with the Insane Clown Posse and the Juggalo movement. She also performed at Violent J's first solo charity tour with Lil Eazy-E.

In 2021, Rockafeller released "Hey You", her first solo single in over 2 years to tease her newest album Scared of Heights. The video received over 250 thousand views within a single day.

Side projects 
In 2012, Rockafeller launched her line of jewelry 'Toys on Chains'.

Personal life

Relationships
In 2017, Rockafeller began dating Canadian rapper Tom MacDonald. Together, they started the band GFBF and began writing music. When Macdonald wrote 'Dear Rappers' and became famous, Rockafeller poured herself into supporting him. She shot and directed all of his music videos after 2017, created his website, co-wrote hooks, and helped him navigate the music industry away from the pitfalls she experienced.

Influences 
Rockafeller has cited some of her influences as Good Charlotte, Blink-182, Fugees, A Tribe Called Quest, Damian Marley, Weezer, Busta Rhymes, Outkast, Bright Eyes, Nirvana, Die Antwoord, and Meg Myers.

Discography

Studio albums

Extended plays

Singles 
"1990s" (2014)
"Made in Gold" (2015)
"MI YARD" (2016)
"Wishing Well" (2018)
"Jesus on My Neck" (2018)
"Genghis Khan" (2018)
"Hey You" (2021)
"Did Your Best" (2021)

With Tom MacDonald
"Sober" (2020), with Madchild, ft. Nova Rockafeller
"Bad News" (2020), with Madchild, ft. Nova Rockafeller
"Gang Gang" (2021)
"No Good Bastards" (2021), with Nova Rockafeller & Brandon Hart
"Church" (2021), with Brandon Hart ft. Nova Rockafeller
"Heart Emojis" (2021), with Brandon Hart ft. Nova Rockafeller
"In God We Trust" (2022), with Adam Calhoun, Struggle Jennings, & Nova Rockafeller

With Violent J
"Sick Kidz" (2016), with Violent J, ft. Young Wicked, Nova Rockafeller & Lil Eazy-E

With The Wikid One
"Find Me" (2017), ft. Nova Rockafeller

With Rp Jesus
"Pillz" (2017), ft. GFBF, Nova Rockafeller & Tom MacDonald

With Thrashole
"You Want Her" (2018, ft. Blimes, The Buttress & Nova Rockafeller

With D-LinQuint
"Superstar" (2019), ft. Nova Rockafeller, Y.I.C & Jay P

With Rachel Geek
"Come Talk to Me" (2020), ft. Nova Rockafeller

References

External links 
-*

1988 births
Living people
21st-century Canadian rappers
21st-century Canadian women musicians
Canadian women rappers
Canadian women songwriters
Canadian people of English descent
Canadian people of French descent
Canadian people of Ukrainian descent
Canadian expatriates in Jamaica
Musicians from Edmonton
YouTube channels launched in 2009
Mercury Records artists
Island Records artists
Def Jam Recordings artists
Canadian hip hop singers
Canadian punk rock singers
Electronic dance music musicians
Canadian music video directors
21st-century women rappers